The Sun Yat-sen or Zhongshan Memorial Hall is an octagon-shaped building in Guangzhou, capital of China's Guangdong Province. The hall was designed by Lu Yanzhi and was built with funds raised by local and overseas Chinese people in memory of Sun Yat-sen. Construction work commenced in 1929 and completed in 1931. The hall is a large octagonal structure with a span of  without pillars, housing a large stage and seats 3,240 people.

History
The memorial hall stands on the site of Guangzhou's Presidential Palace during the Constitutional Protection Movement, when the Nationalists operated a rival "Chinese" government to the Zhili Clique's Beijing regime. The palace was damaged during Ye Ju's 16 June 1922 attack on Sun Yat-sen, during which—though he had already fled—his wife narrowly escaped shelling and rifle fire before meeting him on the gunboat Yongfeng, where they were joined by Chiang Kai-shek. The hall itself has been severely damaged and repaired several times until 1998, when it was comprehensively upgraded to its present-day condition. A statue of Sun Yat-sen was erected in front of the main entrance.

Transportation
The memorial hall is accessible from Sun Yat-sen Memorial Hall Station of Guangzhou Metro.

See also
 Sun Yat-sen Mausoleum in Nanjing
 Sun Yat-sen Memorial Hall in Taipei
 Sun Yat Sen Nanyang Memorial Hall in Singapore

References

Bibliography
 .
 .

Buildings and structures completed in 1931
Buildings and structures in Guangzhou
Monuments and memorials to Sun Yat-sen
Tourist attractions in Guangzhou
Monuments and memorials in China
Major National Historical and Cultural Sites in Guangdong
Yuexiu District